New York State Route 285 (NY 285) was a state highway in Oneida County, New York, in the United States. The southern terminus of the  route was at an intersection with NY 69 west of the hamlet of Taberg in the town of Annsville. Its northern terminus was in the community of Thompson Corners, where it ended at a junction with County Route 67A (CR 67A) and CR 70. NY 285 was little more than a connector between NY 69 and Thompson Corners, as it did not pass through any other areas of interest.

NY 285 initially extended from Taberg to the hamlet of Florence when it was assigned as part of the 1930 renumbering of state highways in New York. It was truncated to Thompson Corners , but extended slightly in the 1960s when NY 69 was realigned to bypass Taberg. Ownership and maintenance of NY 285 was transferred to Oneida County on September 1, 1988, and the NY 285 designation was removed just over two months later. The route is now County Route 70A.

Route description

NY 285 began at an intersection with NY 69 southwest of the hamlet of Taberg in the town of Annsville. The route headed northward, intersecting with Main Street, which connected NY 285 to Taberg. Here, NY 285 turned to the northwest and became Taberg–Florence Road. Just outside Taberg, the route passed Saint Patrick's Cemetery, as well as the remains of an old Protestant cemetery situated directly across NY 285 from it. As it continued northwestward through a rural portion of Oneida County, NY 285 passed a junkyard near the intersection with Pond Hill Road. Past an intersection with Carlisle Road, NY 285 entered a state reforestation area. As such, the surrounding landscape became mostly forested areas. Near the center of the reforestation area, the highway intersected with Skinner Settlement Road (CR 85). After passing over Corkin Hill, NY 285 headed downhill into the town of Florence.

After crossing into Florence, NY 285 remained in the reforestation area, and continued towards Thompson Corners on a linear, northwesterly routing. It passed Greely Cemetery, then continued to Thompson Corners, a very small community in southeastern Florence. NY 285 terminated here at an intersection with Empeyville Road (CR 67A) and Wolcott Hill Road (CR 70). CR 70 turned northwest at this junction to follow NY 285's right-of-way to the hamlet of Florence and eventually to the Oneida County line.

History
NY 285 was assigned as part of the 1930 renumbering of state highways in New York to a highway connecting NY 69 (Main Street) in Taberg to the isolated hamlet of Florence in the town of the same name via Thompson Corners. The route was truncated southeastward to Thompson Corners . In the early 1960s, NY 69 was rerouted to follow a new purpose-built highway that bypassed most of Taberg to the south. Most of NY 69's original alignment through the hamlet was transferred to the town of Annsville; however, its former western approach into Taberg along Taberg Road was realigned to meet the bypass and became a short extension of NY 285.

On September 1, 1988, ownership and maintenance of NY 285 was transferred from the state of New York to Oneida County. The portion of the exchange relating to NY 285 was described in New York State Highway Law as follows, with annotations in brackets:

In return, the state of New York assumed maintenance over a portion of River Street (CR 32) that connected NY 69 in Oriskany to NY 49 in Marcy. This highway became NY 922E, an unsigned reference route. Meanwhile, the NY 285 designation remained in place until November 4, 1988, when it was officially removed from the highway. The former routing of NY 285 became CR 70A, a spur of the pre-existing CR 70.

Major intersections

See also

List of county routes in Oneida County, New York

References

External links

285
Transportation in Oneida County, New York